The Benin national football team (French: Équipe nationale de Football du Benin), nicknamed Les Guépards (The Cheetahs), represents Benin in men's international association football and are controlled by the Benin Football Federation. They were known as Dahomey until 1975, when the Republic of Dahomey became Benin.

Benin have been affiliated with FIFA since 1962 and are a member of the Confederation of African Football since 1969. They have never qualified for the World Cup, but have participated at four Africa Cups of Nations in 2004, 2008, 2010 and 2019, never placing in the top two in the group stage at all of these occasions. However, Benin has a unique record as the country is the first national team to reach the quarter-finals of an AFCON edition without gaining a single win in their AFCON history.

History
Benin hosted its first official international match on 8 November 1959, a 1-0 loss to Nigeria. The match was played while the country was still a French dependency, prior to its independence on 1 August 1960.

Benin qualified for the 2004 Africa Cup of Nations, their first AFCON in history. However, they lost all three matches to South Africa, Morocco and Nigeria. Benin's only goal was scored by Moussa Latoundji against Nigeria.

History repeated itself again in 2008, when Benin lost to Mali, the Ivory Coast and Nigeria. Again, they scored only one goal through Razak Omotoyossi in the 4-1 defeat to the Ivory Coast.

In 2010, Benin's football championship was suspended after the Benin Football Federation's president, Anjorin Moucharaf, was arrested. Members of the BFF decried the imprisonment, saying that Moucharaf had been unjustly accused of fraud, leading to 12 of the 15 board members resigning in protest. 

In the 2010 World Cup qualifiers, Benin topped their group in the second round. They started with a defeat to Angola but went on to win the next four matches and ensure their qualification before the final day. In the third round of the qualifiers, Benin finished second in their group, three points behind Ghana. Despite not qualifying for the 2010 FIFA World Cup, Benin's second place finish ensured their qualification to the 2010 Africa Cup of Nations, where they drew against Mozambique to receive their first ever point at the AFCON. The Squirrels then lost their other two matches against Nigeria and defending champions Egypt to finish third in their group and fail to progress to the next round. After that disastrous performance, on 8 February 2010, the Benin Football Federation, not willing to accept a group stage exit for the third time in a row, dissolved the national team and sacked coach Michel Dussuyer, as well as the rest of his staff. Dussuyer was unaware that he had been sacked and claimed that he had not done anything wrong. The team became an innocent victim of enraged African countries failing to accept defeat at major tournaments and disbanding their national teams in the early 2010s, along with Nigeria, the team that Benin have met in the group stage of all three of their AFCONs before their disbandment, which were suspended for two years by President Goodluck Jonathan after the 2010 FIFA World Cup.

In the second round of the 2014 World Cup qualifiers, Benin were placed in Group H with Algeria, Mali and Rwanda. Benin finished third in their group, failing to advance to the next round.

On 9 May 2016, FIFA suspended Benin for unknown reasons.

At the 2019 Africa Cup of Nations, despite advancing only as the third-best third-placed team, Benin, reunited with Dussuyer, reached the quarter-finals, where they lost to Senegal, with a shock win over Morocco.

Results and fixtures
The following is a list of match results in the last 12 months, as well as any future matches that have been scheduled.

2022

2023

Coaching history

 Serge Devèze
 Wabi Gomez
 Peter Schnittger (1992)
 Moise Ekoue  (1993)
 Cecil Jones Attuquayefio (2003–2004)
 Hervé Revelli (2004)
 Edmé Codjo (2005–2007)
 Didier Notheaux (2007)
 Reinhard Fabisch (2007–2008)
 Michel Dussuyer (2008–2010)
 Jean-Marc Nobilo  (2010)
 Denis Goavec  (2010–2011)
 Edmé Codjo (2011–2012)
 Manuel Amoros (2012–2014)
 Didier Ollé-Nicolle (2014)
 Oumar Tchomogo (2015–2017)
 Michel Dussuyer (2018–2021)
 Moussa Latoundji (2022–)

Players

Current squad
The following players were called up for the 2023 AFCON qualification matches against Rwanda on 22 and 27 March 2023.

Caps and goals correct as of 8 June 2022, after the match against

Recent call-ups
The following players have been called up for Benin in the last 12 months.

Player records

Players in bold are still active with Benin.

Competitive record

FIFA World Cup

Africa Cup of Nations

West African Nations Cup

WAFU Nations Cup

References

External links

Football au Bénin 
Le miroir du football béninois! 

 
African national association football teams